Santiago Moreno Hernando (born 2 February 1964 in San Miguel de Cornesa) is a retired Spanish triple jumper. His personal best jump was 16.93 metres, achieved in July 1991 in Ávila. This is the current Spanish record.

Achievements

References

External links

1964 births
Living people
Spanish male triple jumpers
Athletes (track and field) at the 1992 Summer Olympics
Olympic athletes of Spain